is a railway station on the Nippō Main Line in Kokuraminami-ku, Kitakyushu, Fukuoka Prefecture, Japan, operated by Kyushu Railway Company (JR Kyushu).

Lines
Abeyama-kōen Station is served by the Nippō Main Line. During the daytime, only "Local" all-stations services stop at this station, with four trains per hour in either direction.

History
Abeyama-kōen Station opened on 9 March 1987.

Passenger statistics
In fiscal 2011, the station was used by an average of 3,366 passengers daily.

The passenger figures for previous years are as shown below.

Surrounding area
 Abeyama Park
 Kitakyushu General Hospital
 Kitakyushu Yugawa Junior High School
 National Route 10

See also
 List of railway stations in Japan

References

External links

  

Railway stations in Japan opened in 1987
Railway stations in Fukuoka Prefecture
Buildings and structures in Kitakyushu